Nanma Dam is a rockfill dam located in Tochigi prefecture in Japan. The dam is used for flood control and water supply. The catchment area of the dam is 139.3 km2. The dam impounds about 210  ha of land when full and can store 51000 thousand cubic meters of water. The construction of the dam was started on 1969.

References

Dams in Tochigi Prefecture
1969 establishments in Japan